The 2022 IBJJF World Jiu-Jitsu Championship was an international jiu-jitsu event organised by the International Brazilian Jiu-Jitsu Federation (IBJFF) and held at the California State University, Long Beach in California from 2 to 5 June 2022.

Men's medallists 
Adult male black belt results

Women's medallists 
Adult female black belt results

Teams results 
Results by Academy

See also 
World IBJJF Jiu-Jitsu Championship
European IBJJF Jiu-Jitsu Championship
Pan IBJJF Jiu-Jitsu Championship

References 

World Jiu-Jitsu Championship